Major facilitator superfamily domain containing 7 is a protein that in humans is encoded by the MFSD7 gene.

MFSD7is an atypical SLC, thus a predicted SLC transporter. It clusters phylogenetically to the Atypical MFS Transporter family 5(AMTF5) and the SLC49 family.

References